Events from the year 1604 in art.

Events
Robert Peake the Elder is appointed picture maker to Henry Frederick, Prince of Wales.

Publications
Karel van Mander - Schilder-boeck

Paintings

Annibale Carracci (approximate date)
Landscape with the Flight into Egypt (Doria Pamphilj Gallery, Rome)
The Martyrdom of St. Stephen (The Louvre, Paris)
Monsignor Agucchi (York Art Gallery, England)
Self-portrait (Hermitage Museum, Saint Petersburg)
Caravaggio
John the Baptist (Kansas City)
John the Baptist (Galleria Nazionale d'Arte Antica, Rome)
The Crowning with Thorns (Prato)

Births
February 6 - Jean Varin, French sculptor and engraver (died 1672)
July 8 - Christiaen van Couwenbergh, Dutch Golden Age painter (died 1667)
September 21 - Angelo Michele Colonna, Italian painter of frescoes (died 1687)
date unknown
François Anguier, French sculptor (died 1669)
Mario Balassi, Italian painter (died 1667)
Giovanni Giacomo Barbelli, Italian painter, active in Brescia (died 1656)
Charles Beaubrun, French portrait painter (died 1692)
Bartolommeo Bianco, Italian architect, engineer, and painter (died 1656)
Luigi Baccio del Bianco, Italian architect, engineer, scenic designer and painter (died 1657)
Pierre Daret, French portrait painter and engraver (died 1678)
Chöying Dorje, 10th Karmapa, head of the Kagyu School of Tibetan Buddhism and a painter and sculptor (died 1674)
Gijsbert d'Hondecoeter, Dutch painter of barnyard fowl (died 1653), father of Melchior d'Hondecoeter.
Johann Anton Eismann, Austrian painter (died 1698)
Giovanni Battista Michelini, Italian painter of religious and mythological subjects (died 1655)
Jan Baptist van Heil, Flemish painter (died 1688)
Cheng Zhengkui, Chinese landscape painter and poet (died 1670)
probable
Jan Boeckhorst, German-born Flemish Baroque painter (died 1668)
Viviano Codazzi, Italian architectural painter (died 1670)

Deaths
March 1 - , German sculptor (born 1535)
date unknown
Pier Angelo Basili, Italian painter born in Gubbio (born 1550)
Ottavio Semini, Italian painter born and trained in Genoa (born 1530)
probable - William Rogers, English engraver (born 1545)

 
Years of the 17th century in art
1600s in art